National Tertiary Route 618, or just Route 618 (or ) is a National Road Route of Costa Rica, located in the Puntarenas province.

Description
This route is the access road to Manuel Antonio National Park.

In Puntarenas province the route covers Quepos canton (Quepos district).

Junction list
The route is completely within Quepos district.

History
This route was severely damaged in November 2020 due to Hurricane Eta.

References

Highways in Costa Rica